Robert "Bob" Wertheim (9 November 1922 – 29 April 2020) was an American naval officer involved in the development of strategic weapons. Senator Robert Byrd described him as "the Navy's leading authority on strategic missiles".

Born and raised in New Mexico, Wertheim attended the New Mexico Military Institute before appointment to the United States Naval Academy. He graduated in time to join in the occupation of Japan. Returning to the United States, Wertheim began a long involvement in missile development, including work on the Regulus cruise missile, Polaris ballistic missile, Chaparral anti-aircraft missile, Poseiden ballistic missile, and Trident ballistic missile. During his time working on missile development, he graduated from the Massachusetts Institute of Technology. After retiring from the United States Navy as a rear admiral (upper half), he was a senior vice president at Lockheed Corporation, and engaged in consulting work.

Early life
Robert Halley Wertheim was born to Joseph Wertheim and Emma Vorenberg in Carlsbad, New Mexico on 9 November 1922. Following the attack on Pearl Harbor, he enrolled into the New Mexico Military Institute; graduating in 1942. He received an appointment to the United States Naval Academy. At the Naval Academy, he competed on the school's fencing team. He graduated with honors in 1945, and he was commissioned as an ensign upon graduation as part of an accelerated wartime program.

Military service
Following his graduation from the Naval Academy, Wertheim's first assignment was on the destroyer , on which he participated in the occupation of Japan. Transferred to the destroyer  at Okinawa, he served as the ship's assistant engineering officer and communications officer, before being sent to San Francisco to attend electronics school. Upon completing electronics school, Wertheim was assigned to the destroyer escort , which spent the winter of 1947 providing electricity to Maine.

Following his assignment to Maloy, Wertheim was reassigned to Sandia Base, where he was a member of the Navy's first nuclear bomb assembly team. he wished to study nuclear physics, but was due for a sea assignment; accordingly, he selected the seaplane tender , which was used to test guided missiles. In 1954, Wertheim enrolled at the Massachusetts Institute of Technology, earning a master's degree in nuclear physics. That same year, he was detailed to the heavy cruiser  while it had SSM-N-8 Regulus missiles embarked. As a lieutenant in 1955, Wertheim headed the group that worked on the design of the atmospheric reentry body of the warheads mounted onto the UGM-27 Polaris. In June 1956, Wertheim was assigned to the  United States Navy Special Projects Office, originally part of the Bureau of Ordnance, where he stayed until June 1961. During that time he continued the work he began in 1955, heading the Re-Entry Body Section, receiving the Navy Commendation Medal for his efforts.

After assignment to the Special Projects Office, Wertheim was assigned to the Naval Ordnance Test Station in California from 1961 to 1962. While there, he worked on the development of the AIM-9 Sidewinder for naval surface air defense, called Osprey, which was ultimately cancelled in 1963; he was able to take that work and utilize it for the Army and Marine Corps Air Defense Artillery, including influencing the naming of the system, the MIM-72 Chaparral, Chaparral being the name for a roadrunner in Mexican Spanish, the state bird for Wertheim's home state.

In late 1962, Wertheim was reassigned to the Pentagon, serving under the Director of Defense Research and Engineering Dr. Harold Brown, whom he had met while working on the Polaris missile. That same year, Wertheim was tasked with writing a report for the United States that advocated for the adoption of the Polaris missile by the United Kingdom instead of the continuing to develop independently the cancelled GAM-87 Skybolt. Wertheim remained at the Pentagon as the Military Assistant for Strategic Weapons until August 1965, which earned him a Joint Service Commendation Medal. During those years, he was instrumental in having the Strategic Projects Office increase the UGM-73 Poseidon's targeting accuracy by switching the missile's guidance system from only inertial to stellar-inertial guidance. He returned to the Special Projects Office in Washington, D.C. in late 1965.

In 1971, Wertheim was elevated to the rank of rear admiral. That year, he was awarded the Rear Admiral William S. Parsons Award by the Navy League of the United States. At some point in his career, before 1974, Wertheim attended and graduated from the Naval Postgraduate School. In 1977, he was elected as a member of the National Academy of Engineering, and he became the Director of the Strategic Systems Projects.  In April 1979, Senator Robert Byrd said that Wertheim "is the Navy's leading authority on strategic missiles"; in addition to work on the Polaris and Poseidon missiles, Wertheim had also made significant contributions to the development of the Trident missile family. In October 1979, Wertheim was awarded the Navy Distinguished Service Medal.

Post-military life

For seven years, beginning in 1981, Wertheim was the senior vice president of science and engineering of Lockheed Corporation. In 1983, along with several other dozen retired flag officers, Wertheim took out a full-page advertisement in the Washington Times condemning retired Rear Admiral Gene La Rocque for appearing on Soviet Union television and himself condemning the defense policy of the United States. In 1987, the New Mexico Military Institute inducted Wertheim into their hall of fame. Beginning in 1988, Wertheim became a private consultant with Science Applications International Corporation. He also did consulting work with the Lawrence Livermore National Laboratory, Los Alamos National Laboratory, United States Department of Defense, and the Draper Laboratory. In 2000, on behalf of the University of California, Wertheim was the lead of a review of Los Alamos National Laboratory after hard drives temporarily went missing. Wertheim was a member of Sigma Xi and Tau Beta Pi.

Personal life and retirement
In April 1946, Wertheim became engaged to Barbara Louis Selig of West Los Angeles; they married in December 1946. Barbara gave birth and was the mother of their children Joseph and David. In 2001, Barbara, Wertheim's wife of 54 years, died. In 2005, the alumni association of the Naval Academy awarded Wertheim their Distinguished Graduate Award Medal. By 2005, Wertheim had remarried, to Joan Levin. In 2005, Wertheim spoke to The New Mexico Jewish Historical Society. The next year, he was given the Distinguished Submariner Award by the Naval Submarine League. In 2008, Wertheim was a member of the Defense Science Board's Permanent Task Force on Nuclear Weapons Surety. In 2012, his son Joseph died in Pittsburgh. On 29 April 2020, Wertheim died; he was buried in Section 11 of Miramar National Cemetery.

Notes

References

External links

1922 births
2020 deaths
Jewish American military personnel
New Mexico Military Institute alumni
Military personnel from New Mexico
Massachusetts Institute of Technology alumni
People from Carlsbad, New Mexico
Recipients of the Navy Distinguished Service Medal
United States Naval Academy alumni
United States Navy admirals